The ancient Sthaneshwar Mahadev Temple, dedicated to Lord Shiva is situated in old Kurukshetra city Kurukshetra district of Haryana, India. It was here that the Pandavas along with Krishna prayed to Shiva and received his blessings for victory in the battle of Mahabharata. The ninth Guru, Shri Tegh Bahadur stayed at a spot near the Sthaneshwar Tirtha that is marked by a gurdwara just besides this temple.

This is the place where Lord Mahavishnu and Dadheechi has quarrelled and Dadheechi won the Devathas.

History 

The temple called Sthaneshwar is dedicated to Lord Shiva, the presiding deity of the ancient city of Sthaneshwar presently known as Thanesar city or Kurukshetra city. The legends place its antiquity to Mahabharata period. It is said that Krishna worshiped Lord Shiva Done Abhishekam here along with the Pandavas and got the blessing for the victory in the forthcoming battle of Mahabharata. Krishna specially prayed O God “ Maheshwara", I will protect pandavas(Dharma) in any situation, but there are some powerful Astras which I can't "it is also believed that Kauravas consist of deadliest astra which can't be controlled by any one except lord Shiva who is Mahakaal pilgrimage to Kurukshetra without visiting this tirtha is supposed to be incomplete and fruitless. Pushpabhuti, the founder of the Vardhana Empire of Thanesar named the capital of his kingdom after Sthaneshwar Shiva. The present temple is said to be constructed by Sadashivrao Bhau, the Commander-in-Chief of Maratha forces, to commemorate his victory over Ahmed Shah Abdali at Kunjpura before the third battle of Panipat.

Legend 
Legend has it that the waters of the tank adjoining the temple are holy. A few drops of water cured the King Ban of leprosy. No pilgrimage of Kurukshetra is believed to be complete without a visit to this ancient, holy temple. The tank and temple lie a short distance from the Thanesar town, which gets its name from this temple. It is also believed that Lord Shiva was first worshipped here in the form of a lingam. The ancestor of the Mahabharata heroes, Kuru, performed penance on the banks of the Yamuna and Parshuram, the great warrior sage killed many Kshatriyas here.

About the deity 
The temple of Sthaneshwar is the abode of Lord Shiva and this town served as the capital of Emperor Harshavardhana. The temple with a dome-shaped roof follows a regional type of architecture. The facade of the roof is shaped like an 'amla' along with a tall pinnacle. The Lingam is ancient and still venerated by the local people.

References

External links 
http://Kurukshetra.nic.in
 Shri Sthaneshwara Temple

Hindu temples in Haryana
Kurukshetra
Hindu pilgrimage sites in India
Shiva temples in Haryana
Mahabharata
Tourist attractions in Kurukshetra district